August Emanuel Sørensen (15 November 1896 – 1 March 1979) was a Danish track and field athlete who competed in the 1920 Summer Olympics. He was born in Helsingør and died in Frederiksberg. In 1920 he was a member of the Danish relay team which finish fifth in the 4 × 100 metre relay event. In the 100 metres competition as well as in the 200 metres event he was eliminated in the quarter-finals.

References

External links
profile

1896 births
1979 deaths
Danish male sprinters
Athletes (track and field) at the 1920 Summer Olympics
Olympic athletes of Denmark
People from Helsingør
Sportspeople from the Capital Region of Denmark